Sacred Heart School is a Catholic private elementary school in the Roman Catholic Diocese of Allentown, in Bethlehem, Pennsylvania, United States.

History

Campus

Curriculum

Extracurricular activities
Student groups and activities include academic bowl, altar serving, band, choir, CYO, Math Counts, one-act play, Scouting, spelling bee, student council, talent show, and yearbook. Sports include basketball, cheerleading, cross country, football, track & field, and volleyball.

References

External link
Official website

Roman Catholic Diocese of Allentown
Catholic elementary schools in Pennsylvania
Bethlehem, Pennsylvania
Schools in Northampton County, Pennsylvania